The Ensaf Movement (or "Justice Movement") is a social-democratic political party in Libya. The party is led by Mohammad Alareshiya and was founded in early 2014. The party advocates worker rights, secularism, feminism and disbandment of militias. Its founder and current leader serves as its only member in the Presidential Council.

Ideology
The movement cites social democracy and the Nordic model as inspiration for its political program. It opposes privatization and warned from the consequences of borrowing from the IMF.

References

2014 establishments in Libya
Feminist organizations in Libya
Feminist parties in Africa
Political parties established in 2014
Political parties in Libya
Social democratic parties in Africa
Socialist parties in Libya